The Egypt women's national handball team is the national team of Egypt. It is governed by the Egyptian Handball Federation and takes part in international handball competitions. After there was no women's team from 2012 until 2022 they decided to reestablish a team.

Team 
Amina Atef 33 RW

Kenzy Hatem 14 RW

Yard Hany 66 RB

Malak Talaat 25 RB

Amina Hesham 4 LW

Mariam Omar 6 LW

Noha Ayman 90 LB

Sara Yehia 77 LB

Toka kamel 22 LB

Sohaila Khaled 21 LB

SHaima ElWazira 98 CB

Shahd Hossam 10 Pivot

Laila Hammad 23 Pivot

Shahd Elshawarby 44 pivot

Mai Gomaa 1 GK

Menna ElSaid Gk

Farah Elshazly GK

African Championship record
1974 – 3rd
1981 – 6th
1983 – 8th
1985 – 7th
1987 – 6th
1989 – 5th
1991 – 7th
2004 – 6th
2010 – 6th
2012 – 9th
2022 – 8th

References

External links

IHF profile

Women's national handball teams
Handball
National team